The 2005–2006 Jordan League was the 54th season of Jordan Premier League, the top-flight league for Jordanian association football clubs. Shabab Al-Ordon won the championship for the first time, while Kfarsoum was relegated and Shabab Al-Hussein were expelled. A total of 10 teams participated.

Teams

Map

League standings

References

2003
Jordan
1